Phyllobium is a genus of green algae, in the family Chlorochytriaceae.

References

Chlamydomonadales genera
Chlamydomonadales